is a train station in the town of Tarui,  Fuwa District, Gifu Prefecture, Japan, operated by Central Japan Railway Company (JR Central).

Lines
The westbound main line track does not pass Tarui station since opening of the bypass in 1944, express trains and freight trains use this track. The eastbound main line track passes Tarui station and is used by all eastbound trains. Westbound local trains use the "Tarui branch line" (the old main westbound track) which parallels the eastbound main line.

Layout
Tarui Station has one side platform and one island platform connected by a footbridge. The station has a Midori no Madoguchi staffed ticket office.

Platforms
There is a side platform serving a track on the north side of the station and an island platform serving 2 tracks on the south side of the station.

Adjacent stations

|-
!colspan=5|Central Japan Railway Company

History

 25 May 1884: Ogaki - Sekigahara and Tarui stations were opened.
 23 August 1901: Ogaki - Tarui portion was double tracked.
 10 February 1902: Tarui - Sekigahara portion was double tracked
 11 October 1944: By-pass line and Shin Tarui were opened. Only eastbound trains stopped at Tarui.
 1 November 1946: Tarui branch opened. Every eastbound local train and some westbound local trains stopped at Tarui.
 1 November 1986: Shin-Tarui Station was closed. Every local train in both directions stopped at Tarui.
 1 April 1987: Railways were privatized and Tarui Station was inherited by JR Central.
 March 2018: Station numbering was introduced; Tarui Station was assigned station number CA78.

Shin-Tarui Station
It was about 3 km far from Tarui Station and only westbound local trains stopped at the station. It had 1 through track and 1 siding track with a side platform.

The following photographs taken in December 2002 show the remains of Shin Tarui Station:

Passenger statistics
In fiscal 2015, the station was used by an average of 2628 passengers daily (boarding passengers only).

Surrounding area
Tarui Town Hall
site of Tarui Castle

See also
 List of Railway Stations in Japan

References

External links

  

Railway stations in Japan opened in 1884
Railway stations in Japan opened in 1883
Railway stations in Gifu Prefecture
Stations of Central Japan Railway Company
Tōkaidō Main Line
Tarui, Gifu